Dr. Dr .Humphrey Kimani Njuguna (born July 19, 1961). He was a member of the National Assembly of Kenya, representing Gatanga Constituency (2013-2017). He served as the Chairman of the Institution of Surveyors of Kenya (1999-2003) and Mangu Highschool (2001-2007).He was a board member of Public Procurement Oversight Authority (2012-2013) .

Currently, he serves as the Managing Director of Metrocosmo limited, Chairman of Moi University Council, Chairman Rivatex E.A Limited and Chairman Former Parliamentarians Association (FOPA); that brings all former Members of Parliament together since independence. He is also a board member of Moi Teaching and Referral Hospital(MTRH).

Professionally he is a Licensed & Registered Valuer, an Advocate of High Court of Kenya, Arbitrator (MCIArb.), Lead Expert E.I.A and E.A., Court Annexed Mediator and Adjunct Lecturer School of Law, University of Nairobi.

EDUCATIONAL BACKGROUND.

2012 - 2017:     PhD Law (UoN)

2010 - 2015:     PhD (JKUAT) Entrepreneurship.

2008 - 2010:      Executive Masters of Business Administration (EMBA)

2008 - 2009:     JKUAT. Certificate of Environmental Impact Assessment and Environmental Audit.

2003 - 2005:     LLM University of Nairobi - (International Trade and Investment Law)

2003 - 2005:     Diploma (Kenya School of Law)
  
1999 - 2003:     L.L.B. Hons, (University of Nairobi)

1990 - 1990:     Diploma (Institution of Surveyors of Kenya)

1983 - 1986:     B.A. (Land Econ), Hons University of Nairobi

1980 - 1981:     K.A.C.E. - Lenana School

1976 - 1979:     E.A.C.E. - Chinga Boys High School

ACHIEVEMENTS IN GATANGA CONSTITUENCY AS THE AREA M.P

1. The lobbying and implementation of the following tarmac roads in Gatanga Constituency;

a. Gatiiguru - Macvast - Ithanga Road.

b. Kirwara - Kigio - Jogoo Kimakia Road.

c. Gatura - Ndakaini Road.

d. Kimandi- Kirangi - Gatakaini Road.

e. Karingaini - Nyaga - Jasho - Mukurwe - Njaini - Gitiri - Mariano Road....among others...

This totals to about 220 kms of tarmac.

2. He delivered the following notable projects in the constituency:

a. Chomo and Kimakia water intake

b. Water treatment plant at Rwegetha

c. Belgian mega water project for Lower Gatanga

d. Negotiated for 10% of water distribution to Gatanga residents on completion of the Northern Water Collector Corridor works.

Once these water projects are completed, every residence in Gatanga shall have access to clean and adequate drinking water.

3. The renovations and construction of over 80 primary schools in Gatanga constituency, a model that is being replicated in the entire Country.

4. New construction of Wanduhi Primary School, Kiangige Primary School, Mwea Primary School, Karangi Secondary School, Giteme Secondary School among others.

5. Erection of 48 high security masts (mulika mwizi)…Transforming Gatanga into one of the most lit - up Rural constituencies in Kenya.

6. Construction of 15 boda boda sheds with inbuilt attendant enabling shops.

7. Purchase of a Toyota Hilux for the D.E.O to help in supervising schools.

8. Purchase of a school bus for all Gatanga Primary Schools.

9. Purchase of a Toyota Landcruiser for the CDF constituency office.

10. Construction of Gatanga Technical Training Institute at Ndunyu Chege

11. Starting the construction of the proposed level 4 hospital at Ndunyu Chege

12. Construction of over 10 Police housing units at Kirwara Police station

13. Sinking of 3 boreholes

14. Construction of Kiandiu bridge

15. Conclusively dealing with the land ownership problem at Kihiu Mwiri.

16. Sponsored 56 all-inclusive medical camps.

17. Sponsored the Gatanga CDF Soccer League

18 Sponsored the licensing of over 3000 Boda Boda Riders

19. Re-instituted the award of very transparent and accountable Bursary Scheme in the constituency

20. Constructed 7 modern markets in various centres across Gatanga that have boosted and empowered local Entrepreneurship.

References

External links
Profile

Living people
1961 births
Members of the National Assembly (Kenya)